Rush Township may refer to:

 Rush Township, Jo Daviess County, Illinois
 Rush Township, Shiawassee County, Michigan
 Rush Township, Buchanan County, Missouri
 Rush Township, Champaign County, Ohio
 Rush Township, Scioto County, Ohio
 Rush Township, Tuscarawas County, Ohio
 Rush Township, Centre County, Pennsylvania
 Rush Township, Dauphin County, Pennsylvania
 Rush Township, Northumberland County, Pennsylvania
 Rush Township, Schuylkill County, Pennsylvania
 Rush Township, Susquehanna County, Pennsylvania

Township name disambiguation pages